Monestier is derived from monasterium, Latin for monastery, and may refer to the following places in France:

 Monestier, Allier, a commune in the department of Allier
 Monestier, Ardèche, a commune in the department of Ardèche
 Monestier, Dordogne, a commune in the department of Dordogne
 Monestier-d'Ambel, a commune in the department of Isère
 Monestier-de-Clermont, a commune in the department of Isère
 Monestier-Merlines, a commune in the department of Corrèze
 Monestier-Port-Dieu, a commune in the department of Corrèze
 Saint-Paul-lès-Monestier, a commune in the department of Isère
 Le Monestier, a commune in the department of Puy-de-Dôme
 Le Monestier-du-Percy, a commune in the department of Isère
 Monestier, a family name of different branches especially in France, Italy and the Americas.